Adam Williamson (born August 4, 1984) is a former American soccer player, who last played midfielder for the Ocean City Barons in the USL Premier Development League.

Williamson grew up in Petersburg, Cape May County, New Jersey and played soccer at Ocean City High School.

Williamson played college soccer for Lehigh University from 2002 to 2005. In 79 games he scored 12 goals and notched 15 assists. He played for the Ocean City Barons of the Premier Development League in the summer of 2005, playing in 13 games, notching four goals and six assists. He was selected in the third round, 35th overall in the 2006 MLS Draft by the New England Revolution, but waived at the end of the season. He subsequently signed for the Hammerheads in April 2007, and made his debut against Charlotte Eagles on May 11, 2007. He played in 14 league games for the Hammerheads that year, scoring one goal and two assists. He scored his first professional goal on June 19, 2007, in a road game at the Bermuda Hogges. It was the lone goal in a 1-0 victory.

Williamson last played for the Ocean City Barons during the 2008 season where he appeared in 12 games and dished out four assists.

References 

1984 births
Living people
American soccer players
Lehigh Mountain Hawks men's soccer players
USL Second Division players
USL League Two players
Wilmington Hammerheads FC players
New England Revolution players
Ocean City Nor'easters players
New England Revolution draft picks
Soccer players from New Jersey
Sportspeople from Cape May County, New Jersey
Association football midfielders